The Karnaprayag–Saikot–Sonprayag Kedarnath Railway, notified as the project of national strategic importance, is Indian Railways's one of the four constituent routes of the proposed Char Dham Railway connecting the holiest Chota Char Dham of Hinduism. This 99 km route starts from Karnaprayag and ends at Sonprayag 13 km before Kedarnath.

Railway Routes
The 99 km route starts from a "Y" fork at Karnaprayag off under construction Rishikesh–Karnaprayag Railway, goes via Saikot and ends at Sonprayag where people can trek further 13 km to Kedarnath.

Rishikesh–Karnaprayag Railway is also an under construction new railway link extension from the exiting Rishikesh railway station to Karnaprayag.

Current Status
Char Dham Railway project's 327 km long construction, costing INR ₹43,292 crore (USD $6.6 billion), began with the foundation stone laying and commencement of INR ₹120 crore Final Location Survey (FSL) in May 2017 by the Union Railway minister.

Its Final Location Survey Had Been Completed In September 2020 By A Foreign Company With a Budget Of 130 Crore. As Informed By Indian Railways.Suresh Prabhu.

See also

 Doiwala–Dehradun–Uttarkashi–Maneri Gangotri Railway
 Uttarkashi–Palar Yamunotri Railway
 Saikot–Joshimath Badrinath Railway
 Rishikesh–Karnaprayag Railway
 Diamond Quadrilateral railway project
 Golden Quadrilateral road project
 Setu Bharatam railway crossing-free flyover and underpass project

References

Rail transport in Uttarakhand

Proposed railway lines in India